Sìchéng (泗城) may refer to:

 Sicheng, Si County, town in Anhui, China
 Sicheng, Lingyun County, town in Guangxi, China